William Terence McCavana (24 January 1922 – 16 September 2015) was a Northern Irish footballer who played as a defender.

Career
Born in Belfast, McCavana began his career as an amateur for Coleraine. He left in 1948 when he moved to England with the RAF, signing for Notts County where he made three league appearances. He returned to Coleraine after a year, staying there for twelve seasons before moving to New Zealand in 1960 to play for Eastern Union. He spent the rest of his life in New Zealand with his wife and five children, and "he played an active role in attempting to establish football in the country throughout the 1960s and 70s."

He also earned three caps for the Northern Ireland national team.

References

1921 births
2015 deaths
Association footballers from Northern Ireland
Northern Ireland international footballers
Coleraine F.C. players
Notts County F.C. players
Gisborne City AFC players
NIFL Premiership players
English Football League players
Association football defenders
Expatriate association footballers from Northern Ireland
Expatriate footballers in England
Expatriate association footballers in New Zealand
Expatriate sportspeople from Northern Ireland in New Zealand